Anisakhan Airport is an airport located at Anisakhan, Pyin Oo Lwin, Mandalay Region of Myanmar. This airport no longer serves commercial airlines. This airport is now a military airport

References

Airports in Myanmar
Pyin Oo Lwin District